Nélson Augusto Tomar Marcos (born 10 June 1983), known simply as Nélson, is a Cape Verdean-born Portuguese footballer who plays as a right back.

After making a name for himself at Benfica, appearing in 107 official games over three seasons, he went on to spend the vast majority of his career in Spain, representing Betis, Osasuna, Almería and Alcorcón. He also competed professionally in Italy and Cyprus.

Nélson won four caps for the Portugal national team, during three years.

Club career

Early years
Born in Sal, Cape Verde, Nélson started his professional career with Vilanovense FC. He began making a name in the Primeira Liga with Boavista FC, having joined from soon-to-be-extinct S.C. Salgueiros also in Porto.

In May 2005, Nélson was involved in a car crash along with countryman and former Boavista player José Bosingwa, who represented FC Porto at the time. The latter, behind the wheel of his jeep at the time of the accident, was travelling too quickly and due to wet conditions he crashed the car into an embankment which was followed by the car bursting into flames; one passenger required his foot to be amputated, whilst the other three were unharmed.

Benfica
Nélson signed with S.L. Benfica from Boavista for €1.5 million in the summer of 2005, on a five-year contract. He made the right-back spot his own upon his arrival, making twenty-five appearances during his first season; in the 2006–07 campaign, he was also a starter.

In the 2006–07 UEFA Champions League, after having faced Manchester United in the same competition and stage the season before, Nélson scored a fantastic goal with a long-range shot into Edwin van der Sar's top-right hand corner at Old Trafford, on 6 December 2006; eventually, the game was lost 1–3 and Benfica had to settle for a place in the UEFA Cup after finishing third.

Betis

In late August 2008, Nélson moved to Real Betis in Spain for €6 million, on a five-year deal. He quickly became an automatic first-choice, as the Andalusia side was eventually relegated.

On 31 August 2010, Nélson was loaned to CA Osasuna, with the Navarrese having an option to make the move permanent at the season's end. Battling with Damià for first-choice status throughout the vast majority of the campaign, he netted on 20 December 2010 in a 4–0 away victory over Hércules CF, his first goal in over four years.

On 11 May 2011, in the last minute of the first half of a La Liga home fixture against Sevilla FC (eventual 3–2 home win), Nélson collided with opponent Lautaro Acosta, fracturing his left ankle in the outcome. His injury was not as serious as initially expected though.

Nélson spent the first part of 2011–12, with Betis again in the top level, recovering from his condition. On 4 December 2011, in one of his first bench appearances, he was caught on camera talking to his previous team Osasuna's assistant manager Alfredo, leading to rumours that he was filtering his team's lineup to the opposition, which was denied by both parties.

On 11 February 2012, in his very first game for the Verdiblancos upon his return, Nélson scored from long distance in the 90th minute of the match against Athletic Bilbao, for a 2–1 home win.

Palermo
On 28 January 2013, days after being released by Betis, Nélson moved to Italy's U.S. Città di Palermo, agreeing to a contract until June 2015 and rejoining former Benfica teammate Fabrizio Miccoli. He scored in his Serie A debut the following week, but his late backheel goal could not help prevent a 1–2 home loss to Atalanta BC.

Nélson returned to Spain and its top division on 2 August 2013, signing with UD Almería in a season-long loan deal. He subsequently returned to Palermo, but was immediately deemed surplus to requirements and was not even called up to join the first team pre-season camp; his contract was terminated by mutual consent in August 2014.

Later years
In late August 2014, free agent Nélson joined C.F. Os Belenenses. He made his competitive debut on 13 September, featuring as a right midfielder and playing 78 minutes in a 1–1 away draw against Sporting CP.

Nélson returned to Spain on 29 July 2015, signing a one-year deal with AD Alcorcón.

International career
Nélson was granted Portuguese citizenship in December 2005, and played in the 2006 UEFA European Under-21 Championship. He received his first call-up to the senior team in the UEFA Euro 2008 qualifier against Kazakhstan on 15 November 2006, but did not leave the bench.

Nélson finally made his full debut on 31 March 2009, appearing in a 2–0 friendly win with South Africa in Lausanne, Switzerland.

Statistics

Honours
AEK Larnaca
 Cypriot Cup: 2017–18

References

External links
 
 
 

1983 births
Living people
People from Sal, Cape Verde
Portuguese people of Cape Verdean descent
Cape Verdean footballers
Portuguese footballers
Association football defenders
Primeira Liga players
Liga Portugal 2 players
Segunda Divisão players
S.C. Salgueiros players
Boavista F.C. players
S.L. Benfica footballers
C.F. Os Belenenses players
La Liga players
Segunda División players
Real Betis players
CA Osasuna players
UD Almería players
AD Alcorcón footballers
Serie A players
Palermo F.C. players
Cypriot First Division players
AEK Larnaca FC players
Portugal under-21 international footballers
Portugal international footballers
Portuguese expatriate footballers
Expatriate footballers in Spain
Expatriate footballers in Italy
Expatriate footballers in Cyprus
Portuguese expatriate sportspeople in Spain
Portuguese expatriate sportspeople in Italy
Portuguese expatriate sportspeople in Cyprus